Inigo Prabhakar is an Indian actor who predominantly acts in Tamil films. He made his entry into acting in 2005 in the film Ji as Ajith's friend.  
In 2007, he played a role named John as Rockers team captain in the film Chennai 600028. Later he played roles in the films Azhagarsamiyin Kuthirai and Sundarapandian.

Filmography

Television

References

Living people
Male actors from Tamil Nadu
People from Tirunelveli district
Male actors in Tamil cinema
1985 births